The House of Luxembourg (or Luxembourg), also known as the House of Ardenne–Luxembourg in order to distinguish it from later families, were a Lotharingian noble family known from the tenth and eleventh centuries. They are one of the three main branches of the House of Ardenne, along with the House of Ardenne–Verdun, and the House of Ardenne–Bar. 

All these Ardennes families descended from Cunigunda of France, a granddaughter of the West Frankish king Louis the Stammerer, and her husband Wigeric of Lotharingia. The Luxembourg branch descend from their son Sigfried, Count of the Ardennes. 

One continuing male-line branches of the House of Luxembourg include the House of Salm. The later House of Limburg, Dukes of Limbourg, whose descendants became Dukes of Luxembourg and a royal dynasty in Germany, descend from the House of Ardennes-Luxembourg through the daughter of Frederick, Duke of Lower Lorraine.

Children of Count Sigfried:

Siegfried? cited in 985
Henry I of Luxembourg
Frederick I, Count of Salm and Luxembourg, married Ermentrude of Gleiberg, daughter of Heribert I, Count of Gleiberg and Ermentrud (Imizi). Ancestor of the main known continuing lines...
 Henry VII (d. 1047), Count of Luxembourg and Duke of Bavaria
 Frederick, Duke of Lower Lorraine (1003–1065), Duke of Lower Lorraine. Ancestor of the Dukes of Limburg, and the Limburg-Luxemburg dynasty.
 Giselbert of Luxembourg (1007–1059), Count of Longwy, of Salm, and of Luxembourg, who continued the male line...
 Conrad I, Count of Luxembourg († 1086) 
 Hermann of Salm († 1088), count of Salm, founder of the House of Salm
 daughter, married count of Hillesleben
 daughter, married Kuno, count of Oltingen
 Adalbéron († 1097 at Antioch), canon at Metz
 Adalbéron III (d. 1072), Bishop of Metz
 Thierry of Luxembourg, father of :
 Thierry (d. 1075)
 Henry, Count Palatine of Lorraine (d. 1095)
 Poppon of Metz (d. 1103), Bishop of Metz
 Hermann of Gleiburg
 Ogive of Luxembourg (990–1036); married in 1012 to Baldwin IV (980–1035), Count of Flanders
 Imiza of Luxembourg; married Welf II of Altdorf, Count in Lechrain (d. 1030)
 Oda of Luxembourg; canoness at Remiremont, then Abbess of Saint-Rémy at Lunéville
 Gisèle of Luxembourg (1019–after 1058); married Radulfe, Lord of Aalst (d. after 1038); parents of Gilbert de Gant
 Dietrich II, bishop of Metz, 1006-1047
 Adalberon, archbishop of Trier 1008-1046
 Gislebert (d.1004), count in the Moselgau
 Cunigunda, married Henry II, Holy Roman Emperor
 Eve, married Gerhard of the Mosel, Count of Metz
 Ermentrude, abbess
 Luitgarde, married Arnulf, Count of Holland
 a daughter, married Thietmar

Family tree

Sources

County of Luxembourg
House of Ardennes
Dukes of Lorraine
Lorraine noble families